Megasternum is a genus of water scavenger beetles in the family Hydrophilidae. There are at least four described species in Megasternum.

Species
 Megasternum concinnum (Marsham, 1802)
 Megasternum obscurum
 Megasternum posticatum (Mannerheim, 1852)
 Megasternum punctulatum Horn, 1890

References

Further reading

 
 
 
 
 

Hydrophilidae